Mark Stephen Waters (born June 30, 1964) is a British-Born American filmmaker.

Career 

He directed the comedy films Freaky Friday, Mean Girls, Ghosts of Girlfriends Past, Mr. Popper's Penguins, and Vampire Academy. The first movie he directed was the independent hit The House of Yes starring Parker Posey. Other movies he directed include Head Over Heels, The Spiderwick Chronicles, Bad Santa 2, Magic Camp, He's All That, and more. He was attached to direct a movie called Minimum Wage written by Scott Atkinson and Tegan West.

Filmography
Film

Producer
 500 Days of Summer (2009)

Television

References

External links

1964 births
AFI Conservatory alumni
Living people
American male screenwriters
Film producers from Michigan
People from Wyandotte, Michigan
English-language film directors
Film directors from Michigan
Screenwriters from Michigan